Auplopus albifrons is a spider wasp of the family Pompilidae.

Description
Auplopus albifrons are medium-sized wasps, with short petiole on first abdominal segment and red first abdominal terga. Females typically have long legs, slender body and long curling antennae. They show an elongated clypeal margin.

Biology
The females build their brood cells of mud on walls or stones. They prey various species of spiders. The female wasps usually amputate the legs of their prey before transporting them to the nest to make them easier to carry. Prey may be transported by flight or more often by crawling along the ground. The captured spiders are stored in cells in the nest. The female wasp lays an egg on each spider and later the wasp larvae feed and develop on the spider.

Habitat
The species prefers warmer areas and occurs in light forests and dry open woodland.

Distribution
This species is present in Austria, Bosnia, Denmark, Finland, France, Germany, Greece, Italy, Romania, Spain and Switzerland.

Subspecies
 Auplopus albifrons albifrons (Dalman, 1823)

Bibliography
 Wahis, R. - Mise à jour du Catalogue systématique des Hyménoptères Pompilides de la région ouest-européenne. Additions et Corrections. Notes fauniques de Gembloux 59 (1) 31-36
 Wahis, R. - Catalogue systématique et codage des Hyménoptères Pompilides de la région ouest-européenne. Notes fauniques de Gembloux 12: 1-91
 Vikberg, 1986 - A checklist of aculeate Hymenoptera of Finland (Hymenoptera, Apocrita Aculeata) Not. Ent. 66 (2): 65-85

References

External links
 Bold Systems
 Insects.fi

Pepsinae
Hymenoptera of Europe
Insects described in 1823